Ronald King Murray, Lord Murray, PC (15 June 1922 – 27 September 2016) was a Scottish Labour politician and judge who rose to be a Senator of the College of Justice in 1979.

Life
Educated at George Watson's College, Edinburgh, the University of Edinburgh and Jesus College, Oxford, he served in the REME and SEAC from 1941 to 1946. He was admitted as an advocate in 1953, served as an Advocate Depute from 1964 to 1970 (from 1967 as a Senior Advocate Depute). He was appointed a Queen's Counsel in 1967.

He was an unsuccessful candidate for Caithness and Sutherland in 1959, Edinburgh North in a May 1960 by-election, and Roxburgh, Selkirk and Peebles in 1964 and 1965. He was elected and sat for Edinburgh Leith from 1970 until 1979.

He served as Lord Advocate from March 1974 until May 1979, and was appointed a Privy Counsellor in 1974. In 1979 he was appointed to the Court of Session and High Court of Justiciary as a Senator of the College of Justice, with the judicial title Lord Murray.  His uncle David King Murray had been a Senator of the College of Justice from 1945 to 1955.

In April 1977, the Young Liberals' annual conference unanimously passed a motion to call on the Liberal leader (David Steel) to move for the impeachment of Murray for allegedly mishandling a murder case. Despite the urgings of the then chairman of the Young Liberals, Peter Hain, Steel did not table such a motion in the House of Commons, but Murray agreed that the Commons still have the right to initiate an impeachment motion.

Lord Murray was an active supporter of the World Court Project U.K., part of a worldwide network directed to obtaining a decision on the legality of using nuclear weapons. Success came in 1996, when the International Court of Justice ruled, in an advisory opinion, that the use of such weapons and the threat to use them would generally be illegal as contrary to international humanitarian law.

He died on 27 September 2016 at the age of 94.

Family

He was nephew of David King Murray, Lord Birnam

References 
 

1922 births
2016 deaths
People educated at George Watson's College
Alumni of the University of Edinburgh
Lord Advocates
Royal Electrical and Mechanical Engineers officers
British Army personnel of World War II
Murray
Scottish Labour MPs
Members of the Parliament of the United Kingdom for Edinburgh constituencies
Alumni of Jesus College, Oxford
UK MPs 1970–1974
UK MPs 1974
UK MPs 1974–1979
Members of the Privy Council of the United Kingdom
Scottish King's Counsel
20th-century King's Counsel